The Michigan Mr. Football Award is an honor accorded to a high school football player from Michigan.  It is presented by STATE CHAMPS! Michigan and sponsored by Hungry Howie's, and is awarded based on a combination of player performance and fan voting.

Honorees

References

Mr. Football awards
American football in Michigan
2008 establishments in Michigan